Henry Poley (5 January 1654 – 7 August 1707) was an English lawyer and Member of Parliament. He was the son of Sir Edmund Poley (1619–1671) who was MP for Bury St Edmunds, and brother of Edmund Poley the diplomat.

Poley matriculated at Jesus College, Cambridge in 1672, and graduated B.A. in 1673, having been a fellow commoner since 1670. He was then a Fellow of the college to 1675. He entered Gray's Inn in 1669, and the Middle Temple in 1672, being called to the bar in 1678.

He represented Eye between 1689 and 1695, West Looe between 1703 and 1705, and Ipswich from 1705 until his death in 1707. 

On 5 March 1707, Poley was reported to be "dangerously ill". He died on 7 August, aged 54, and was buried at Badley.

Notes

1654 births
1707 deaths
Members of the Parliament of England (pre-1707) for Ipswich
Members of the pre-1707 English Parliament for constituencies in Cornwall
English MPs 1689–1690
English MPs 1690–1695
English MPs 1702–1705
English MPs 1705–1707
Members of the Parliament of Great Britain for Ipswich
British MPs 1707–1708